Gary Wolfe may refer to:

 Gary K. Wolfe, science fiction editor, critic and biographer
 Gary Wolfe (wrestler)

See also
Gary Wolf (disambiguation)
Wolfe (surname)